The Posnansky/Fronius PF-1 White Knight is a Swiss/American FAI Standard Class high-wing, T-tailed, single-seat glider that was designed and constructed by Hernan Posnansky and later greatly redesigned by Posnansky and Robert L. Fronius.

Design and development
The PF-1 was initially constructed by Posnansky in Switzerland in 1963, while he was a student at ETH Zurich there. The aircraft resembles the FFA Diamant, which was also under construction at the same time and place. Posnansky flew the aircraft for one year and then later moved to San Diego, California. The aircraft was inactive until 1983. Posnansky and Fronius greatly modified the PF-1 and re-licensed it as a US Experimental - Amateur-built, N15PF, in 1983.

The PF-1 is of mixed construction. The fuselage is a glass and foam sandwich, while the wings are from a Schleicher Ka 8 and thus have spruce spars covered in birch plywood and doped aircraft fabric covering. The wing employs a NACA 64-415 airfoil and has terminal velocity dive brakes on the top  and bottom surfaces. The tow hook is mounted on the aircraft's center of gravity. The landing gear is a fixed and faired monowheel. The cockpit features a reclined pilot position and a side-stick.

Even though it uses the same wing as the Ka 8 the White Knight has a glide ratio that is seven points higher, due to the more streamlined fuselage.

Only one PF-1 was ever built.

Operational history
As of June 2011 the PF-1 was still on the Federal Aviation Administration registry and co-owned by Posnansky and Fronius.

Specifications (PF-1)

See also

References

1960s United States sailplanes
1960s Swiss sailplanes
Homebuilt aircraft
Aircraft first flown in 1963